Kim Kyung-roul (23 February 1980 – 22 February 2015) was a South Korean professional billiards player. He won the 2010 Three-Cushion World Cup.

Kim lived in Ilsan, where he died on 22 February 2015, after falling out of his apartment window. He was 34.

References

1980 births
2015 deaths
Accidental deaths in South Korea
Asian Games bronze medalists for South Korea
South Korean carom billiards players
Accidental deaths from falls
Asian Games medalists in cue sports
Cue sports players at the 2006 Asian Games
Cue sports players at the 2010 Asian Games
Medalists at the 2006 Asian Games